Malik Muhammad Rafique Rajwana (born 20 February 1949) was the 32nd Governor of Punjab, in office since 10 May 2015. He is affiliated with PML-N.

He conducted landmark cases, including Mian Nawaz Sharif, Memogate Scandal, Election expenses,  Alstom Energy Ltd, Rally Energy Ltd and Liverpool Cotton Association. He was the chairman of the parliamentary committee for appointment of the Chief Election Commissioner of Pakistan in 2014.

Early life 
He is a native of Multan in southern Punjab. Rajwana graduated from Government Emerson College Multan and earned a master's degree in Economics from Forman Christian College University, Lahore.

Career 
Rajwana joined the judiciary in 1987, resigning, later to start law firm Rajwana & Rajwana. In 1996, he was elected as President of High Court Bar Association Multan. His core areas of practice are Civil, Company, Alternate Dispute Resolution and Arbitration.

He served as senator from southern Punjab in 2012. Rajwana is the senior Advocate Supreme Court of Pakistan.

In February 2014, he was appointed chair of the parliamentary committee for appointment of Chief Election Commissioner of Pakistan.

He has been member of senate committees for Foreign Affairs, Law Justice and Human Rights, Government Assurances, Committee on Rules of Procedure and Privileges, Senate House Committee, Devolution Process

On May 10, 2015 he became Governor of Punjab.

References 

Living people
Pakistani lawyers
Forman Christian College alumni
Politicians from Multan
Pakistan Muslim League (N) politicians
Governors of Punjab, Pakistan
Punjabi people
1949 births
Pakistani senators (14th Parliament)
Government Emerson College alumni